Muhammad Iqbal (1877–1938) was a philosopher, poet and politician in British India.

Muhammad Iqbal may also refer to:
 Muhammad Iqbal (athlete) (born 1927), Pakistani Olympian as a hammer thrower
 Muhammad Iqbal (footballer) (born 2000), Indonesian footballer
 Muhammad Iqbal (sport shooter) (born 1929), Pakistani Olympian
 Muhammed Zafar Iqbal (born 1952), Bangladeshi scientist and writer
 Mohammad Iqbal (Canadian cricketer) (born 1973), Pakistan-born Canadian cricketer
 Mohammad Iqbal (Emirati cricketer) (born 1975)
 Muhammad Saad Iqbal (born 1977), Pakistani citizen held in extrajudicial detention in the United States Guantanamo Bay detention camps

See also
 Bali Mauladad, Muhammad Iqbal Mauladad, Kenyan Indian big game hunter